Chad Daniels is an American comedian from Fergus Falls, Minnesota. His albums have reached the top 10 on the Billboard comedy charts three times: No. 2 for 2017's Footprints On The Moon, No. 6 for 2019's Dad Chaniels, and No. 7 for 2014's Natural Selection. As of 2019, his albums have been streamed more than 700 million times. Footprints on the Moon also reached No. 1 on the iTunes comedy chart. 

In 2020, Vulture.com called him "one of the great unsung American comedians right now, who has some of the best stuff about being a dad out there."

Early life
Daniels was born March 2, 1975, in Fergus Falls, Minnesota. He graduated from Fergus Falls High School (now named Kennedy Secondary School) in 1993.

Career

Stand-up comedy
Daniels' comedy is known for what Allmusic critic Mark Deming described as a "skewed, often dark view" on domestic family life. 

He started performing standup at an open mic night at ACME Comedy Company in Minneapolis in 1998. His performance earned him a job as house emcee at Grand Forks, North Dakota, comedy club Westward Ho, hosting six shows a week in 1998-1999. 

In 2003, Daniels was a finalist in Comedy Central’s Laugh Riots competition.

In 2009, he was named Artist of the Year in comedy by Minneapolis alt-weekly City Pages, which said "Plenty of comics have jokes about marriage and children, but few speak about the experience with such uncompromising honesty."

He has toured extensively in the U.S. and across the world. In 2012, he won the $10,000 grand prize at the Gilda's LaughFest competition in Grand Rapids, Michigan. He also performed at the Just for Laughs Festival in Montreal in 2004 and 2012, Limestone Comedy Festival, Akumal Comedy Festival, World Comedy Festival, and the Aspen Comedy Festival, where he won the Comic's Comic award. 

He hosts a weekly podcast, Middle of Somewhere, with fellow comedian Cy Amundson.

Television and film
Daniels' 2008 Comedy Central Presents half-hour special was named fifth-best all-time special by viewers in the network's 2010 Stand-Up Showdown. He has also starred in two hour-long specials, 2012's As Is and 2019's Dad Chaniels.

He is featured in J. Elvis Weinstein's documentary I Need You To Kill.

He has also appeared on The Tonight Show with Conan O’Brien (one of only 13 comics to appear on that version of the show), O’Brien’s TBS talk show Conan, The Late Late Show with both Craig Kilborn and Craig Ferguson, Live at Gotham, The Bob and Tom Show, and Laugh Riots.

Albums
Daniels has released seven albums: three with Stand Up! Records, three with 800 Pound Gorilla Records, and his self-produced debut.

Richard Lanoie of The Serious Comedy Site called Daniels "a smart, funny, surprising stand-up whose comedy will stand the test of time." He and Brett Watson both named You’re The Best in the website's top 10 comedy albums of 2012; Lanoie called it "a superb, brilliant, smart, very funny, original album." Lanoie called 2014's Natural Selection "funny and original". Reviewing Natural Selection, Chris Spector of  Midwest Record said "Daniels keeps the laughs coming (in) rapid-fire fashion without any misses." Jake Austen of Roctober magazine, reviewing his early albums, was impressed that Daniel could deliver "domesticated, regular-guy" humor about families and airline food "yet manages not to lose his edge."

Personal life
Daniels is divorced, and has a son named Isaac and daughter named Olivia. In March 2023, fellow comedian Kelsey Cook announced on Sirius XM's Jim and Sam Show that she and Daniels were dating. Cook also stated that the two had recently moved in together.

Discography
Two Minutes for Stale Hacking (self-released)
Busy Being Awesome (Stand Up! Records, 2009)
You're the Best (Stand Up! Records, 2012)
Natural Selection (Stand Up! Records, 2014)
Footprints on the Moon (800 Pound Gorilla Records, 2017)
Dad Chaniels (800 Pound Gorilla Records, 2019)
Twelfth Night (800 Pound Gorilla Records, 2021)

Filmography

Film
As Is (2012)
I Need You To Kill (2017)	
Dad Chaniels (2019)

Television
The Late Late Show with Craig Kilborn
Live at Gotham (2006)
Comedy Central Presents (2008)
The Tonight Show with Conan O'Brien (2009)
The Bob and Tom Show (2010)
Conan (2012, 2014, 2018)
The Late Late Show with Craig Ferguson (2012)

References

External links

Chad Daniels at Stand Up! Records website

American stand-up comedians
Comedians from Minnesota
Living people
1975 births
People from Fergus Falls, Minnesota
21st-century American comedians
Stand Up! Records artists
20th-century American comedians